Mandu Assembly constituency   is an assembly constituency in the Indian state of Jharkhand. Also one of the 81 assembly constituencies of Jharkhand, Mandu belongs to Hazaribagh parliamentary constituency.

Members of Legislative Assembly 
2005: Khiru Mahto, Janata Dal (United)
2009: Teklal Mahto, Jharkhand Mukti Morcha
2011: Jai Prakash Bhai Patel, Jharkhand Mukti Morcha By Poll
2014: Jai Prakash Bhai Patel, Jharkhand Mukti Morcha
2019: Jai Prakash Bhai Patel, BJP

See also
Vidhan Sabha
List of states of India by type of legislature

References

Assembly constituencies of Jharkhand